Upper Takutu-Upper Esequibo (Region 9) is a region of Guyana. Venezuela claims the territory as part of Bolívar (state) in Esequiban Guyana.

It borders the region of Potaro-Siparuni to the north, the region of East Berbice-Corentyne to the east and Brazil to the south and west. It contains the town of Lethem, and the villages of  Aishalton, Nappi and Surama. It is also the largest region of Guyana.

The Rupununi savannah known for its large biodiversity is located between the Rupununi River and the Brazilian border.

Population
The Government of Guyana has administered three official censuses since the 1980 administrative reforms, in 1980, 1991 and 2002.  In 2012, the population of Upper Takutu-Upper Essequibo was recorded at 24,212 people. Official census records for the population of the Upper Takutu-Upper Essequibo region are as follows:

2012 : 24,212
2002 : 19,387
1991 : 15,058
1980 : 12,873

Communities
List of communities (including name variants):

Achiwib (Achiwuib Village)
Aishalton (Aishalton Village, Ishalton)
Annai (Anwai)
Apoteri
Aranaputa
Awarewaunau (Awaruwaunawa)
Basha Village (Bashaidrun)
Dadanawa
Hiawa
Kaibarupai Village
Kanashen (Konashen)
Karanambo
Karasabai (Karasabai Village)
Karaudarnau (Lumid Pau)
Katoonarib
Kumu Village
Kwaimatta (Kwaimatta Village, Kwaiwatta Village, Kwamatta)
Lethem (Lethen)
Maruranau (Maruranawa, Marurawaunawa, Marurawaunawa Village)
Massara (Massara Village)
Moco-Moco (Moco-Moco Village)
Nappi
Parabara
Parishara (Parishara Village)
Rewa
Sand Creek
Sawariwau
Shea (Shea Village, Shoa)
Shulinab (Shulinab Village, Village Shulinab)
St. Ignatius (Saint Ignatius Mission)
Surama (Surama Village, Surumatra)
Tiger Pond Village
Tipuru (Tipuru Village)
Toka
Warimure
Wichabai
Wowetta (Woweta, Woweta Village)
Yakarinta
Yupukari (Eupukari, Yupukarri)

References

http://www.lib.utexas.edu/maps/americas/guyana_rel_1991.pdf

 
Regions of Guyana